The Stone is a 2013 South Korean film written and directed by Cho Se-rae. It premiered at the 2013 Locarno International Film Festival.

Plot
Min-su is a graduate of the Korean Baduk Academy but despite his outstanding talent, he has been wasting his days as a gambler without pursuing a real career out of it. He chooses to play the game for money, easily beating every opponent that comes his way. Nam-hae is a middle-aged, smalltime gangster boss, brought up on the streets and used to using his fists to gain authority. After accidentally meeting, playing and losing to Min-su in a gambling club, while his goons were collecting the monthly installment of protection money, his taste for the ancient game is rekindled and he hires the boy to become his private instructor.

As he goes deeper into the baduk experience, Nam-hae begins reviewing his own past in the perspective of the rules and requirements of the game and begins to  lose interest in the criminal world, becoming far more concerned with the future of his tutor, whom he encourages to face the challenge of a pro tournament and carve a legitimate future for himself. The fatherless young Min-su, on the other hand, discovers the coarse masculine underworld, the meaning of life and true victory through Nam-hae. However, when Nam-hae's competition starts to expand their territory, he is forced into a path to destruction.

Cast
 Cho Dong-in as Min-su
 Kim Roi-ha as Nam-hae
 Park Won-sang as In-geol
 Myung Gye-nam
 Park Min-gyu
 Son Jong-hak 
 Kim Dong-gon 
 Jo Ji-hwan 
 Heo Joon-seok 
 Choi Jeong-hyeon
 Il Soo-pa 
 So Hee-jung

References

External links 
  
 
 

2013 films
2010s Korean-language films
South Korean action films
South Korean drama films
2010s South Korean films